Geoffrey Stevens may refer to:

 Geoffrey Stevens (British politician) (1902–1981), English chartered accountant and politician
 Geoffrey Stevens (journalist) (born 1942), Canadian journalist, author and educator
 Geoffrey W. Stevens (1891–1963), Canadian politician in the Nova Scotia House of Assembly
 Geoffrey Stevens (cricketer), English cricketer
 Geoff Stevens, South African sailor